Kərimli (also, Kerimli) is a village in the Gadabay Rayon of Azerbaijan.

References 

Populated places in Gadabay District